Blue Island Avenue is a street in the city of Chicago, Illinois that once led to a ridge of land that early pioneers gave the name "Blue Island" because at a distance it looked like an island in the prairie. The blue color was attributed to atmospheric scattering or to blue flowers growing on the ridge. Parts of the present-day neighborhoods of Morgan Park, Beverly Hills and the city of Blue Island, Illinois now occupy this ridge.

Route description
Originally starting from W. Harrison Street and S. Halsted Street, Blue Island Avenue runs between property of the University of Illinois at Chicago and St. Ignatius College Prep, but has been converted into parking lots and recreational areas for the school until it crosses Roosevelt Road. From there it runs southwest to 21st Street, picks up again at Cermak Road (formerly 22nd) and runs more westerly to 26th Street, where it terminates.

Intersections

Notes

References

Streets in Chicago